Al-Wathba SC is a Syrian professional basketball club and department of the Al-Wathba Sports Club based in the city of Homs. The Knights are a two-time Syrian Cup finalist (2019, 2020) and they are among the six best Syrian clubs.

Honours

Domestic
Syrian Basketball League
Sixth place (3): 2007 – 2008 – 2022
Seventh place (1): 2021
Eighth place (1): 2006
Syrian Basketball Cup
Runners-up (2): 2019 – 2020
Damascus Basketball Championship
Runners-up (1): 2009

International
Dubai International Championship
Quarterfinals (1): 2020

Current roster
Squad for the 2021–2022 Syrian Basketball League season:

References

Basketball in Syria
Sports clubs in Syria
Basketball teams in Syria
Basketball teams established in 1953
Sports clubs established in 1937